In organic chemistry, a dipolar compound or simply dipole is an electrically neutral molecule carrying a positive and a negative charge in at least one canonical description. In most dipolar compounds the charges are delocalized.
Unlike salts, dipolar compounds have charges on separate atoms, not on positive and negative ions that make up the compound. Dipolar compounds exhibit a dipole moment.

Dipolar compounds can be represented by a resonance structure. Contributing structures containing charged atoms are denoted as zwitterions. 

Some dipolar compounds can have an uncharged canonical form.

Types of dipolar compounds

1,2-dipolar compounds have the opposite charges on adjacent atoms.
1,3-dipolar compounds have the charges separated over three atoms. They are reactants in 1,3-dipolar cycloadditions.
Also 1,4-dipolars, 1,5-dipolars, and so on exist.

Examples

See also

Zwitterion
Ylide
1,3-dipole
1,3-Dipolar cycloaddition
Betaine

References

Organic chemistry